Oksana Kovtonovich (born September 26, 1977) is a Belarusian sport shooter. She tied for 32nd place in the women's 10 metre air rifle event at the 2000 Summer Olympics.

References

1977 births
Living people
ISSF rifle shooters
Belarusian female sport shooters
Olympic shooters of Belarus
Shooters at the 2000 Summer Olympics